Jamon Brown (born March 15, 1993) is a former American football guard. He played college football at Louisville and was drafted by the St. Louis Rams in the third round of the 2015 NFL Draft.

He has also played for the New York Giants, Atlanta Falcons, and Chicago Bears.

College career
Brown was a starter for the Louisville Cardinals from 2014 to 2015.

Professional career

St. Louis / Los Angeles Rams
Brown was drafted by the St. Louis Rams in the 3rd round, 72nd overall, in the 2015 NFL Draft. He signed a rookie contract worth $2,496,158 over four years. On November 17, 2015, he was placed on injured reserve due to a lower leg fracture. He then returned to play right guard for the Rams.

In 2017, Brown opened the season as the starting right guard. He started all 16 games.

On July 3, 2018, Brown was suspended the first two games of the 2018 season for violating the NFL Policy and Program for Substances of Abuse. In his absence, Austin Blythe took over Brown's previous starting role at right guard, and kept the job upon Brown's return from suspension. On October 30, 2018, he was waived by the Rams.

New York Giants
On October 31, 2018, Brown was claimed off waivers by the New York Giants. He was named the Giants starting right guard in Week 10, and remained there the rest of the season.

Atlanta Falcons
On March 13, 2019, Brown signed a three-year, $18.75 million contract with the Atlanta Falcons. Brown competed with veteran James Carpenter and rookie Chris Lindstrom for a starting guard spot. He was named a backup guard to start the season, but was named the starting right guard prior to Week 2 following an injury to Lindstrom. He was benched in the final games of the season.

Brown was released on August 24, 2020.

Chicago Bears
Brown was signed to the Chicago Bears practice squad on September 6, 2020.

Philadelphia Eagles
On September 15, 2020, Brown was signed by the Philadelphia Eagles off the Bears practice squad. He started Week 6 and right guard as an injury replacement to Matt Pryor. He was released on October 21, but re-signed to the team's practice squad the following day. He was elevated to the active roster on October 22 for the team's week 7 game against the New York Giants, and reverted to the practice squad after the game. Brown was released on December 7 after violating team rules and being kicked out of the team's hotel prior to a game against the Green Bay Packers.

Personal life
Brown has a daughter named Micayla.

References

External links
Atlanta Falcons bio
 Los Angeles Rams bio
Louisville Cardinals profile
New York Giants bio

1993 births
Living people
Players of American football from Louisville, Kentucky
Fern Creek High School alumni
American football offensive guards
American football offensive tackles
Louisville Cardinals football players
St. Louis Rams players
Los Angeles Rams players
New York Giants players
Atlanta Falcons players
Chicago Bears players
Philadelphia Eagles players